Duck walk may refer to:

 Duckwalk, an eccentric form of walking while squatting low
 Strongman event

See also
 Duck Walk Killer, a spree killer in Chicago, Illinois, United States
 Duckboard, a type of boardwalk